The red-browed fig parrot (Cyclopsitta diophthalma macleayana) or Macleay's fig parrot,  is a subspecies of double-eyed fig parrot. It is one of the smaller subspecies. Its range extends from Cooktown to Paluma in northern Queensland.

Description
It is small and light green all over with a red forehead and facial markings. The male has blue around his eyes while the female has golden yellow around her eyes.

References

Cyclopsitta
Parrots of Oceania
Birds of Cape York Peninsula
Birds described in 1874